Isaiah Allen Jackson (born 22 January 1945) is an American conductor who served a seven-year term as conductor of the Pro Arte Chamber Orchestra of Boston, of which he has been named Conductor Emeritus. He was the first African-American to be appointed to a music directorship in the Boston area. Dr. Jackson currently teaches at the Berklee College of Music, the Harvard Extension School, and the Longy School of Music.

Biography

Childhood and education
Isaiah Jackson was born in a predominantly black neighborhood of Richmond, Virginia, the son of an orthopedic surgeon (also named Isaiah Allen Jackson) and his wife Alma Alverta Jackson née Norris. His grandfather was also a surgeon. Arthur Ashe was one of his childhood friends.

When Jackson was 2 years old, he fell on a milk bottle and severed the tendons of his wrist. His father prescribed music lessons for therapy, which he began at age 4, showing immediate dedication and aptitude. From age 14, he studied at Putney, a progressive, integrated and academically intense private boarding school near Brattleboro in Vermont. During his time there, he traveled with his high school class to the former Soviet Union. He also took part in a picket of the local Woolworth's store in support of the lunch counter sit-ins that were happening in the South, for equality and equal access for African-Americans.

Jackson studied Russian history and literature at Harvard University, from which he graduated cum laude in 1966. While there, he had the opportunity to conduct Mozart’s opera Così fan tutte, which helped him decide to pursue music as a career. Subsequently, he went to Stanford University and received his M.A. in music in 1969. He studied with Nadia Boulanger in Fontainebleau, France, before going to the Juilliard School in New York City, from which he graduated D.M.A. in 1973. He also studied at Aspen, Colorado and Tanglewood. At Harvard, he is a Fellow in the W. E. B. Du Bois Institute.

Career

Jackson founded the Juilliard String Ensemble and was its first conductor 1970-71. He was associate or assistant conductor with the American Symphony Orchestra (1970-71) where he worked with Leopold Stokowski; the Baltimore Symphony Orchestra (1971-73); and the Rochester Philharmonic Orchestra (1973-87). He was appointed music director of the Flint Symphony Orchestra (Flint, Michigan) in 1982, the first black music director of the Dayton Philharmonic Orchestra in 1987 (where he conducted Dayton's first-ever performance of Mahler's Symphony No. 8, Symphony of a Thousand), and principal conductor of The Royal Ballet, Covent Garden, in 1986, and became its music director 1987-90.  He was the first black and the first American to occupy a chief position with the company.

He has been a guest conductor with orchestras such as the New York Philharmonic, 1978; San Francisco Symphony, 1984; Detroit Symphony Orchestra, 1983 and 1985; Cleveland Orchestra, 1983-84, 1986-87, and 1989-92; Boston Pops, 1983 and 1990-92 (he was the orchestra’s first black conductor, and the first black conductor to lead the annual "Gospel Night" program), Toronto Symphony Orchestra, 1984 and 1990; Orchestre de la Suisse Romande, 1985 and 1988; BBC Concert Orchestra, 1987; and the Berlin Symphony Orchestra, 1989-91.  He has also conducted the Vienna Symphony (European debut, July 1973), Houston Symphony, Indianapolis Symphony, Grant Park Festival Orchestra, Calgary Philharmonic Orchestra and the Louisville Orchestra

He has also guest conducted the Helsinki Philharmonic Orchestra, Malmo Symphony, Gaeveleborg Symphony, Czech Symphony Orchestra (at the opening of the Prague Autumn International Music Festival), Stockholm Symphonic Wind Orchestra, Prague Radio Symphony Orchestra, Royal Liverpool Philharmonic, RAI Orchestra, Youngstown Symphony Orchestra, and the National Symphony Orchestra in Washington, D.C.  He has also performed with the Dance Theatre of Harlem at the Spoleto Festival in Italy and at the Royal Opera House, London.  He was also music director of the New York Youth Symphony.

In 1973, at Leonard Bernstein’s suggestion, he was named as artistic director of the Vienna Youth Music Festival. He was the first person of color to conduct the Cape Philharmonic Orchestra. He is a particular favorite in Australia, having been principal guest conductor of the Queensland Orchestra in Brisbane for three years and of the Canberra Symphony Orchestra. He has also led the Sydney Symphony, West Australian Symphony, Tasmanian Symphony, Adelaide Symphony, and Melbourne Symphony orchestras. He is also Musician in Residence at the Memorial Church, Harvard University.

He has served as a member of the board of directors of the Ralph Bunche Scholarship Fund, and a member of the music panel of the New York State Council on the Arts.

He won the first Governor's Award for the Arts of the Commonwealth of Virginia, 1979; and in 1991 he was awarded the Signet Society Medal for Achievements in the Arts, awarded by the Signet Society of Harvard University.

His recordings include music by Bernard Herrmann, Miklós Rózsa, Franz Waxman (For the Fallen), William Grant Still, Alberto Ginastera, William Mathias and Nigel Butterley. He recorded the Berlin Symphony’s New Year’s Eve concert. Jackson conducted the Louisville Orchestra and gospel choirs from the Louisville, Kentucky area under the direction of Alvin Parris III. The CD grew out of a project between Jackson and Parris. The project was presented in fourteen U.S. cities; it also opened the Brisbane Biennial Festival of Music and was performed in the Liverpool Anglican Cathedral with the Royal Liverpool Philharmonic.

He was formerly Artist-in-Residence at the University of Dayton, where he taught Philosophy of Music. He has been Visiting Professor of Conducting at the Hochschule der Künste, Berlin's premier conservatory. He has also taught at Juilliard, Stanford, the University of Michigan, and Youngstown State University.

Dr. Jackson currently teaches at the Berklee College of Music, the Harvard Extension School, and the Longy School of Music.  He is also President of Rhythm, Rhyme, Results, an educational music company specializing in curriculum-based educational rap and pop songs.

In October 1994, he was a guest speaker of the National Press Club of Australia.

Personal life
While conducting in Rochester, he met his wife Helen Tuntland, president of Hochstein School of Music & Dance and a consultant in the field of music education. They have three children, Benjamin, Katharine and Caroline. In 1987, he and his family moved to Hammersmith, London. He acknowledges he is an anglophile and he has conducted before members of Britain's royal family on several occasions. He speaks five languages.

Jackson suffers from sensorineural hearing loss. The inner ear damage cost him most of the hearing in his right ear in 1995 and began to affect his left ear in 2004. The hearing loss forced him to retire from conducting in 2006.

He now runs a production company called Rhythm, Rhyme, Results. The organization seeks to educate young people by putting the lessons into the music they listen to.

See also
Black conductors

References

Sources
 answers.com
 Berklee College of Music faculty profile
 Harvard Extension School course
 Longy School of Music
 Rhythm, Rhyme, Results biography
 Democrat and Chronicle profile and update

American male conductors (music)
African-American conductors (music)
African-American classical musicians
1945 births
Musicians from Richmond, Virginia
Living people
Berklee College of Music faculty
Harvard University staff
Harvard University alumni
Classical musicians from Virginia
21st-century American conductors (music)
21st-century American male musicians
Harvard Extension School faculty
21st-century African-American musicians
20th-century African-American people